Monte Chiappo is one of the Apennine Mountains in Italy.

Geography 

Its summit is a tripoint at which the borders of the regions of Piedmont, Lombardy and Emilia-Romagna meet.

References

Mountains of Lombardy
Mountains of Piedmont
Mountains of Emilia-Romagna
Mountains of the Apennines
One-thousanders of Italy